Orbisiana is an Ediacaran benthic organism formed out of series of agglutinated spherical or hemispherical chambers.  It is believed to be a close relative of Palaeopascichnus.

Description 
Orbisiana occur in aggregates made up of rows arranged in sometimes branching chains. 3-D analysis has shown Orbisiana to be cylindrical in shape and open at both the top and bottom ends of its structure. The cell membranes of the organism are often pyritized. The individual chambers are agglutinating.

Diversity 
Two species have been documented, O. linearis and O. simplex.

It fits into the Palaeopascichnids, the other genus being Palaeopascichnus itself.

Distribution 
Over 100 specimens have been collected from the lower Ediacaran Lantian Formation located in Xiuning and Yixian counties of the Anhui Province, China.

Discovery 
Orbisiana was first described by B.S. Sokolov in 1976, found in the Neoproterozoic of Russia.

Ecology 
Orbisiana likely favored calm and well aerated shallow marine habitats in which it could utilize sunlight for benthic photosynthesis.

See also 

 Palaeopascichnid

References 

Ediacaran life
Ediacaran Asia